Cóndor Crux, la leyenda (English: Condor Crux, The Legend), also known as Cóndor Crux, is a 2000 Argentine animated science fiction adventure film written and directed by Juan Pablo Buscarini and Swan Glecer. The film combines 2D animation with 3D computer-generated backgrounds, in a style similar to the American-made Titan A.E. (2000), which was still production at the time of Cóndor Crux'''s release (the film premiered on 6 January 2000, while Titan A.E.'' was released on June 16 of the same year). The film received mixed-to-positive reviews and won a Silver Condor Award for Best Animated Film, but was a failure at the box-office. It is currently available on Disney+ in Latin America (excluding Brazil).

Plot
The action takes place in a dystopian Buenos Aires in 2068 (now called Darwin), where the sinister Phizar, head of a dark corporation, chaotically governs the Southern Cone of the American continent. Dr. Crux is an old rebel scientist who fights the Phizar regime, and his son Juan Crux is the one who must become the hero expected to fight the villain and his henchmen and free the city from the dome that prevents him from making contact with the outside.

Cast
Damián de Santo as Juan 'Condor' Crux
Arturo Maly as Phizar
José Soriano as Dr. Crux
Favio Posca as Sigmund
Leticia Brédice as Zonia
Aldo Barbero as Amauta
Max Berliner as Voice

See also
 List of animated feature-length films
 List of computer-animated films

External links
 

2000 films
2000 animated films
2000s adventure films
Argentine animated films
Spanish animated films
2000s Spanish-language films
Buena Vista International films
2000s Argentine films